Harmon Harmon (born May 15, 1980) is a sprint athlete, who competes for the Cook Islands.

Harmon competed at the 2004 Summer Olympics in the 100 metres he ran in a time off 11.22 seconds and finished 8th in his heat, so didn't qualify for the next round. He also represented the Cook Islands at the 2002 Commonwealth Games.

References

External links
 

1980 births
Living people
Athletes (track and field) at the 2004 Summer Olympics
Cook Island male sprinters
Olympic athletes of the Cook Islands
Athletes (track and field) at the 2002 Commonwealth Games
Commonwealth Games competitors for the Cook Islands